The 1868 Philadelphia mayoral election saw the election of Daniel M. Fox.

The margin of the election was close, and the results were contested and resolved in court.

Results

References

1868
Philadelphia
Philadelphia mayoral
19th century in Philadelphia